Babes in the Woods is a 1932 Silly Symphonies animated film.

It is a re-working of the British folk tale Babes in the Wood, with some material incorporated from Hansel and Gretel by the Brothers Grimm, and the addition of a village of friendly elves (a feature not traditionally present in either tale) and a happier ending.

It is the last Disney short to produce with Cinephone synchronized sound system.

Plot 
The film opens with birds flying around the "Witch Rock", as a singing voice starts to recount the legend relating to it as told in the storybooks. Hansel and Gretel wander the woods and stumble upon a village of dwarfs. They are welcomed in until a witch comes and takes them away on her broom to her candy house. The witch watches them eat the house and invites them inside the house, which is revealed to be filled with cages and handcuffs, with ugly animals.

The witch turns Hansel into a spider and chains him to a post. She takes a potion from the fireplace, throws it on a noisy cat, and turns the cat into stone. She takes Gretel and tries to turn her into a rat, but Gretel smashes the potion. The witch then locks Gretel beneath the floor. The dwarfs come to the rescue of Hansel and Gretel, and save the children.

While the witch is fighting the dwarves, Hansel and Gretel use an antidote to turn the animals back into children. Finally, the witch falls from her broom and into her cauldron from the sky and turns into stone, turning into the Witch Rock.

Home Media
The short was released on December 4, 2001, on Walt Disney Treasures: Silly Symphonies - The Historic Musical Animated Classics.

References

External links
 
 
 Babes in the Woods at disneyshorts.org
 Blog de Babes in the Woods 

1932 films
1932 short films
1930s color films
Silly Symphonies
1930s Disney animated short films
1932 animated films
Films directed by Burt Gillett
Films produced by Walt Disney
Films about witchcraft
Films based on fairy tales
Films about elves
Films based on Hansel and Gretel
Animated films about rats